Hassan Tariq (22 October 1934 – 24 April 1982) was a Pakistani film director, film producer and screenwriter who was famous for making films like Anjuman, Kaneez, Baharo Phool Barsao, Dewar Bhabhi.

Early life and career
Hassan was born on 22 October 1934 in Amritsar, India. He migrated to Pakistan after its establishment. He started his career as an assistant director. He directed his first film, Neend (Sleep) in 1959 and became a successful director. He made around 40 films in Pakistan film industry and was the main reason behind the success of his wife Rani.

Most of his films revolve around the falling women characters or a prostitute with a heart of gold, such as Anjuman (1970), Umrao Jaan Ada (1972) and Surraya Bhopali (1976).

Personal life
Hassan married three times. He was married with actress Nighat Sultana, dancer Emi Minwala and actress Rani.

Death
He died on 24 April 1982 at Lahore, Pakistan.

Awards and recognition
Nigar Award for Best Director in film Behan Bhai (1968).
Nigar Award for Best Director in film Anjuman (1970 film).
Nigar Award for Best Director in film Sangdil (1982).

Filmography
 Neend (1959)
 Banjaran (1962) (a golden jubilee film)
 Phannay Khan (1964) (a Punjabi language film)
 Kaneez (1965)
 Devar Bhabi (1967)
 Behan Bhai (1968)
 Mera Ghar Meri Jannat (1968)
 Anjuman (1970)
 Tehzeeb (1971)
 Umrao Jaan Ada (1972)
 Baharo Phool Barsao (1972)
 Aik Gunnah Aur Sahi (1975)
 Surraya Bhopali (1976)
 Begum Jaan (1977)
 Sangdil (1982)

References

External links

1927 births
1982 deaths
Artists from Amritsar
Urdu film producers
Pakistani film directors
Punjabi people
Nigar Award winners